Raúl Anganuzzi (born 20 July 1906, date of death unknown) was an Argentine fencer. He won a bronze medal in the team foil competition at the 1928 Summer Olympics.

References

External links

1906 births
Year of death missing
Argentine male foil fencers
Olympic fencers of Argentina
Fencers at the 1928 Summer Olympics
Olympic bronze medalists for Argentina
Olympic medalists in fencing
Medalists at the 1928 Summer Olympics
20th-century Argentine people